The Wheels of Destiny (German:Das rollende Schicksal) is a 1923 German silent film directed by Franz Osten.

The film's art direction was by Max Heilbronner.

Cast
In alphabetical order
 Colette Brettel
 Fritz Greiner 
 Ludwig Götz 
 Charles Willy Kayser 
 Ellen Kürti 
 Ferdinand Martini 
 Ernst Rückert

References

Bibliography
 Sanjit Narwekar. Directory of Indian film-makers and films. Flicks Books, 1994.

External links

1923 films
Films of the Weimar Republic
Films directed by Franz Osten
German silent feature films
German black-and-white films
Bavaria Film films
Films shot at Bavaria Studios